A meronomy or partonomy is a type of hierarchy that deals with part–whole relationships, in contrast to a taxonomy whose categorisation is based on discrete sets. Accordingly, the unit of meronomical classification is meron, while the unit of taxonomical classification is taxon. These conceptual structures are used in linguistics and computer science, with applications in biology. The part–whole relationship is sometimes referred to as HAS-A, and corresponds to object composition in object-oriented programming. The study of meronomy is known as mereology, and in linguistics a meronym is the name given to a constituent part of, a substance of, or a member of something. "X" is a meronym of "Y" if an X is a part of a Y.

Example 
Cars have parts: engine, headlight, wheel
Engines have parts: crankcase, carburetor
Headlights have parts: headlight bulb, reflector

In knowledge representation 
In formal terms, in the context of knowledge representation and ontologies, a meronomy is a partial order of concept types by the part–whole relation.

In the classic study of parts and wholes, mereology, the three defining properties of a partial order serve as axioms. They are are, respectively, that the part-of relation is

 Transitive – "Parts of parts are parts of the whole" (If A is part of B and B is part of C, then A is part of C);
 Reflexive – "Everything is part of itself" (A is part of A); and
 Antisymmetric – "Nothing is a part of its parts" (If A is part of B and A ≠ B, then B is not part of A).

Meronomies may be represented in semantic web languages such as OWL and SKOS. In natural languages they are represented by meronyms and holonyms.

See also
Mereology
Meronymy

References

External links 
 Introduction to WordNet: An On-line Lexical Database
 W3C SKOS Home Page

Mereology
Hierarchy
Semantic relations